Capitol Hill Historic District may refer to:

Capitol Hill Historic District (Salt Lake City, Utah), listed on the National Register of Historic Places (NRHP) in Utah
Capitol Hill Historic District (Washington, D.C.), listed on the NRHP in Washington, D.C.